Jonathan Horowitz (born 1966) is a New York-based artist working in video, sculpture, sound installation, and photography. Horowitz critically examines the cultures of politics, celebrity, cinema, war, and consumerism. From found footage, Horowitz visually and spatially juxtaposes elements from film, television, and the media to reveal connections and breakdowns between these overlapping modes of communication.

In 2005, Horowitz's work Three Rainbow American Flags for Jasper in the Style of the Artist's Boyfriend  made of Oil and Glitter on Linen, depicts a glittery American flag with rainbow stripes.  This work references Jasper Johns' 1958 painting Three Flags .

In 2020, Horowitz curated the exhibit We Fight to Build a Free World: An Exhibition by Jonathan Horowitz for The Jewish Museum. Bringing together works by over 70 artists, including Horowitz's own work, "the exhibition looks at how artists have historically responded to the rise of authoritarianism and xenophobia as well as racism, anti-Semitism, and other forms of bigotry. The exhibition also addresses issues surrounding immigration, assimilation, and cultural identity."

Early life and education 
Horowitz is a 1987 graduate of Wesleyan University.

Art market
Horowitz is represented by Xavier Hufkens. Until 2020, he also worked with Gavin Brown's Enterprise.

Solo exhibitions

2018 Leftover Paint Abstractions, Xavier Hufkens, Brussels

2016 Occupy Greenwich, The Brant Foundation Art and Study Center, Greenwich 
160 DOTS, Swiss Institute, New York 
Hillary Clinton Is A Person Too (2008), Museum of Contemporary Art Detroit

2014 Plants, Mirrors, Coke/Pepsi Paintings and More, Xavier Hufkens, Brussels 
402 Dots, Line, and the One Note Samba, Karma, New York

2013 Free Store, Art Basel Miami

2012 "Your Land/My Land: Election '12," Contemporary Art Museum St. Louis, Contemporary Art Museum Raleigh, Arm and Hammer Museum of Art and Culture, Contemporary Art Museum Houston, Utah Museum of Contemporary Art New Museum of Contemporary Art, Telfair Museums, St. Louis, MO, Raleigh, NC, Los Angeles, Houston, TX, Salt Lake City, New York, Savannah, GA

2010 "Minimalist Works from the Holocaust Museum," Dundee Contemporary Arts

2009 Apocalypto Now, Museum Ludwig, Cologne
Jonathan Horowitz: And/Or"  P.S. 1 Contemporary Art Center, New York

2008 Obama 2008Gavin Brown's Enterprise

2007 People Like War Movies Galerie Barbara Weiss, Berlin

2006 Rome, Sadie Coles HQ, London

2005 The New Communism, Gavin Brown’s Enterprise Silent Movie, Yvon Lambert Gallery, New York

2004 Galerie Barbara Weiss, Berlin

2003 Silent Movie, Matrix 151, Wadsworth Atheneum Museum of Art, Hartford, CT Surreal Estate, (with Rob Pruitt), Gavin Brown's Enterprise 
Buero Friedrich, Berlin 
Yvon Lambert, Paris

2002 Go Vegan!, Greene Naftali Gallery, New York Pillow Talk, Sadie Coles HQ, London

2001 Time, Life, People: Jonathan Horowitz at Kunsthalle St. Gallen, Switzerland 
Yvon Lambert, Paris We the People, China Art Objects Galleries, Los Angeles In Person, Bard College Center for Curatorial Studies, Annandale-on-Hudson, NY.

2000 The Jonathan Horowitz Show, Greene Naftali Gallery, New York The Universal Calendar/talking without thinking, Van Laere Contemporary Art, Antwerp, Belgium

1998 Bach Two Part Invention #9, Kenny Schachter/Rove, New York Maxell, Greene Naftali Gallery

References

Further reading
 Stange, Raimar, (2007), Review, People Like War Movies, Modern Painters, November 2007.
 Ammirati, Dominick. (2005), Profile: Jonathan Horowitz. Contemporary,'' 71: 62-5.
 https://www.artsy.net/article/artsy-editorial-jonathan-horowitz-s-new-show-puts-hillary-clinton-among-the-presidents

External links
 Jonathan Horowitz's Works in the Dikeou Collection

1966 births
Living people
Wesleyan University alumni
Place of birth missing (living people)